I Never Sang for My Father is a 1970 American drama film, based on the 1968 play of the same name. It tells the story of a widowed college professor who feels dominated by his aging father, yet still has regrets about his plan to leave him behind when he remarries and moves to California. It stars Melvyn Douglas, Gene Hackman, Dorothy Stickney, Estelle Parsons, and Elizabeth Hubbard.

The film was produced and directed by Gilbert Cates, and Robert Anderson adapted the screenplay from his 1968 Broadway play.

It was nominated for Academy Awards for Best Actor in a Leading Role (Melvyn Douglas), Best Actor in a Supporting Role (Gene Hackman), and Best Writing, Screenplay Based on Material from Another Medium (Robert Anderson).

Plot summary
At the airport, college professor Gene Garrison meets his parents who have returned from Florida.  After driving them home, he takes them out to dinner.  Back home, he spends the evening with them. The barbs of his father, Tom, run through his mind as he drives home. Gene seeks solace in the arms of his mistress, who pines for a more serious relationship with him. Soon after, his mother, Margaret, suffers a heart attack and is hospitalized. Upon visiting her at the hospital, Gene finds Tom pacing in the waiting room. Tom asks Gene to go to the Rotary Club with him, though Gene was expecting not to leave his mother's side.

When Margaret dies, Gene helps his father shop for a casket. His sister, Alice, arrives without her husband and children. She explains to Gene that Tom's failing memory and health will require constant care either in a nursing home or with live-in assistance. She broaches the idea with their father, who rejects it outright. The conversation brings up old tensions about Tom's disinheritance of Alice over her taking a Jewish spouse. Alice leaves Gene to deal with their father by himself.

Gene's girlfriend Peggy arrives for a visit. She is charmed by Tom and offers to relocate to New York to live with Gene and his father. That night, Gene and Tom reminisce together over old photographs. Tom's love for his son comes shining through in their conversation and he asks about a tune that Gene used to sing for him as a boy. Gene confesses that he never sang the tune for his father, but Tom recalls otherwise. Gene tells Tom that he is thinking about moving to California to be with Peggy, where she has a successful gynecological practice. Tom becomes irate at the notion, feeling abandoned. Gene leaves the house with Peggy and never comes back.

Cast
 Melvyn Douglas as Tom Garrison - Father
 Gene Hackman as Gene Garrison - Son
 Estelle Parsons as Alice - Sister
 Dorothy Stickney as Margaret Garrison - Mother
 Elizabeth Hubbard as Doctor Margaret 'Peggy' Thayer
 Lovelady Powell as Norma
 Daniel Keyes as Dr. Mayberry
 Conrad Bain as Rev. Sam Pell
 Jon Richards as Marvin Scott
 Nikki Counselman as Waitress
 Carol Peterson as Nurse #1
 Sloane Shelton as Nurse #2
 James Karen as Mr. Tucker (old age home director)
 Gene Williams as Dr. Jensen (state hospital director)

Production

Original play
Gilbert Cates had been one of the producers of the original stage play together with Doris Warner Vidor. Directed by Alan Schneider and starring Alan Webb, Lillian Gish and Hal Holbrook, it initially ran for 124 performances in New York in 1968 and lost most of its $195,000 investment. The story was widely considered to be quasi-autobiographical.

The play was profiled in the William Goldman book The Season: A Candid Look at Broadway.

Filming
The film was shot at several locations, including Southern California and the Great Neck - Douglaston area of New York. Applauded by critics and viewers, the film (and play)
predicted the coming of the sandwich generation, in this case, grown children and other family members helping their elderly parents who are up in age. It preceded other films on the subject, including The Savages and Away from Her.

Critical reception
Roger Ebert summarized the film in his review before concluding, "These bare bones of plot hardly give any hint of the power of this film. I've suggested something of what it's about, but almost nothing about the way the writing, the direction, and the performances come together to create one of the most unforgettably human films I can remember."

Vincent Canby, in his review for The New York Times, was far less complimentary, writing, "(The film) does the human spirit a disservice in the way it pleads for sympathy for people who are small and flat, like comic strip characters, without sweetness, without imagination, without any suspected reserves of emotion. Indeed, it almost becomes ridiculous when you realize that it is without any honest problem, either psychological or economic." Murf. of Variety called it " dull, distended, and lacking clear point of view" however he called the performances of the lead actors "superb".

Awards and nominations

See also
 List of American films of 1970

References

External links
 
 
 
 
  (archive)

1970 films
1970 drama films
American drama films
1970s English-language films
Films about dysfunctional families
Films about old age
American films based on plays
Films directed by Gilbert Cates
Films set in New York (state)
Films shot in New York (state)
1970 directorial debut films
Films about father–son relationships
1970s American films